Colombia competed at the 2012 Summer Paralympics in London, United Kingdom from August 29 to September 9, 2012.

Medalists

Athletics

Men–track

Men–field

Women–track

Women–field

Key
Note–Ranks given for track events are within the athlete's heat only
Q = Qualified for the next round
q = Qualified for the next round as a fastest loser
WR = World record
PR = Paralympic record
EU = European record
NR = National record
N/A = Round not applicable for the event
Bye = Athlete not required to compete in round

Cycling

Road

Judo

Powerlifting

Swimming

Men

Women

Wheelchair basketball

Men's tournament

Group B

11th/12th place match

References

Nations at the 2012 Summer Paralympics
2012
2012 in Colombian sport